Brooks Observatory  is an astronomical observatory owned and operated by the University of Toledo.  The observatory is used primarily for public viewing and undergraduate instruction.  It hosts an array of small telescopes, the centrepiece of which is a Celestron 14 Edge HD.  It is located on the campus of the University of Toledo in Toledo, Ohio (USA), occupying the 6th floor of McMaster Hall, home to the Department of Physics and Astronomy.

Adjacent to Brooks Observatory is Ritter Observatory, which houses Ritter Planetarium and a one-metre telescope.  In contrast to the telescopes at Brooks Observatory, the Ritter telescope is used for graduate and faculty research.

See also 
Brooks Astronomical Observatory
List of observatories

References

External links
 Ritter Observatory Clear Sky Clock Forecasts of observing conditions.

Astronomical observatories in Ohio
University of Toledo
Buildings and structures in Toledo, Ohio